Catch-67: The Left, the Right, and the Legacy of the Six-Day War is a 2017 book by Israeli philosopher of Jewish thought Micah Goodman on Israeli internal conflict over the West Bank occupation. The English-language translation by journalist Eylon Levy was published by Yale University Press in September 2018.

Synopsis 
The book, written in Hebrew, contends that the conflicted political center on the occupation has views from both the political left and right. Goodman concludes that while an armistice is possible, a comprehensive peace deal is not. The book became the subject of intense public debate, and became a best-seller from its March 2017 release through the next several months. Its release coincided with the 50th anniversary of Israeli victory in the 1967 Six-Day War and the resulting occupation of Palestinian territories.

Reception 
The book received mostly positive reviews. Isabel Kershner wrote in a review for The New York Times: "Examining the political, ethical, religious and security aspects of the conundrum, Mr. Goodman’s book gives equal weight to arguments on all sides. But while he allows that there is a dispute over the legal status of the West Bank land and whether it is truly occupied, he takes a clear stand when it comes to robbing the Palestinians of their freedom." Stu Halpern wrote for the Jewish Book Council "Mic­ah Goodman convincingly argues that although each side of the Israeli polit­i­cal divide believes they know the path to solving "the Pales­tinian problem", both are incorrect. But at the same time, in their own ways, they are each also correct; that is what makes the issue so intractable." Kirkus Reviews wrote that the book is "an eloquent expression of the distant hope that deeply committed human beings can stop, inhale deeply, listen, change, and compromise."

Ehud Barak, former Prime Minister of Israel, reviewed the book for the Haaretz and harshly criticized it, writing:

and:

References

Further reading 

 
 
 

2017 non-fiction books
Works about the Six-Day War
Hebrew-language books
Books about Israel
Books about Palestine (region)
Books about the Arab–Israeli conflict
Philosophy books
Israeli non-fiction books
Yale University Press books